"Graduation" is a song by American music producer and DJ Benny Blanco and American rapper and singer Juice Wrld. The song is based on Vitamin C's 2000 hit "Graduation (Friends Forever)".
 
The song was released on August 30, 2019, and is the second collaboration between the artists since "Roses" in December 2018, which also featured Brendon Urie. It was later included on the reissue of Blanco's debut studio album Friends Keep Secrets, released in 2021.

Juice Wrld's pose in the song's promotional material was later included on the cover art for his first posthumous album, Legends Never Die.

Music videos

Official video
The music video was released on August 30, 2019, and was directed by Jake Schreier.  The video is made up of a montage of students, played by various celebrities, with captions describing how they turned out after high school.  Celebrities who make cameos as students in the video include Justice Smith, Hailee Steinfeld, Noah Cyrus, Dove Cameron, Maddie Ziegler, David Dobrik, Madison Beer, and others.  Juice Wrld appears in the video as a student named "Gary, whose obsession with video games would cost him his sight" while Benny Blanco plays "Mr. Upchuck", a math teacher who claims to have hooked up with a popular clique at a party. Only Steinfeld appears as herself, and she saves humanity by ending the "Robotic War".  Additionally, American comedic rapper Lil Dicky makes an appearance as the principal of the high school.

They are (in order of appearance):
 
 Hailee (Hailee Steinfeld)   
 Jackson (Justice Smith)  
 Ashley (Dove Cameron) 
 Decker (Kaitlyn Dever) 
 Becky (Noah Cyrus)  
 Scott Hammer (Ross Butler) 
 Danny (Tony Revolori)
 Jill (Gracie Abrams) 
 Jasper (Nat Wolff)
 Kristen (Maddie Ziegler)  
 Gary (Juice Wrld)
 Greta (Olivia Munn)
 Dom (Austin Abrams) 
 Vance (Tommy Dorfman)
 Jenny (Peyton List) 
 Ryan (David Dobrik)
 Mr. Upchuck (Benny Blanco)  
 Principal Chooke (Lil Dicky)
 The Untouchables are played by Charlotte Lawrence, Madison Beer, Elsie Hewitt and Bianca Finch

Vertical video
A vertical video was released on October 4, 2019, which features the characters from the music video in a form of the school yearbook.

Charts

Certifications

References

2019 singles
2019 songs
Benny Blanco songs
Juice Wrld songs
Songs written by Benny Blanco
Songs written by Vitamin C (singer)
Songs written by Juice Wrld
Songs written by Cashmere Cat
Song recordings produced by Benny Blanco
Song recordings produced by Cashmere Cat
Songs written by Happy Perez
Vertically-oriented music videos